Manuel de Aróstegui Sáenz de Olamendi (March 24, 1758 – November 7, 1813) was a liberal Spanish politician from the Basque Country.

1758 births
1813 deaths
Spanish politicians
People from Álava
Spanish expatriates in the United States
18th-century Spanish lawyers